Hydrelia arizana is a moth in the family Geometridae. It is found in Taiwan.

References

Moths described in 1911
Asthenini
Moths of Taiwan